In shoemaking, wholecut shoes are shoes which are made from a single piece of flawless leather with or without a backseam—in the latter case it is called a seamless wholecut. These shoes can be entirely plain and smooth or with tiny perforated decorations. Various types of shoes can be made wholecut, but usually the term refers to classic dress shoes. The absence of decorative features and overall conservative look tend to make wholecuts appropriate for black-tie occasions.

See also
Bespoke shoes
Blucher
Brogue
Oxford

References

Shoes
Shoemaking